The 1979–80 TCU Horned Frogs men's basketball team represented Texas Christian University during the 1979–80 men's college basketball season. They finished with a record of 7-19, 2-14 in their conference.

Roster

Schedule

|-
!colspan=9 style=| Southwest tournament

References 

TCU Horned Frogs men's basketball seasons
TCU
TCU Basketball
TCU Basketball